The Kittigazuit Formation is a geologic formation in Nunavut. It preserves fossils.

See also

 List of fossiliferous stratigraphic units in Nunavut

References
 

Geology of Nunavut